Cristóbal Egerstrom Ericksson (born 22 November 1956) is a Mexican-born equestrian, who has been competing for Costa Rica since 2013. He competed in two events at the 1984 Summer Olympics.

Notes

References

External links 
 

1956 births
Living people
Mexican male equestrians
Mexican dressage riders
Costa Rican male equestrians
Costa Rican dressage riders
Olympic equestrians of Mexico
Equestrians at the 1984 Summer Olympics
Equestrians at the 1983 Pan American Games
Equestrians at the 1987 Pan American Games
Equestrians at the 1991 Pan American Games
Equestrians at the 1995 Pan American Games
Equestrians at the 2007 Pan American Games
Equestrians at the 2015 Pan American Games
Equestrians at the 2019 Pan American Games
Pan American Games gold medalists for Mexico
Pan American Games silver medalists for Mexico
Pan American Games bronze medalists for Mexico
Pan American Games medalists in equestrian
Competitors at the 1986 Central American and Caribbean Games
Competitors at the 1990 Central American and Caribbean Games
Competitors at the 1993 Central American and Caribbean Games
Competitors at the 2014 Central American and Caribbean Games
Mexican people of Swedish descent
Mexican emigrants to Costa Rica
Place of birth missing (living people)
Central American Games gold medalists for Costa Rica
Medalists at the 1991 Pan American Games
20th-century Mexican people